West Virginia Route 307 is an east–west state highway located entirely within Raleigh County, West Virginia. The route takes on the shape of a loop, stretching from U.S. Route 19 and West Virginia Route 3 in Beaver in the west and US 19 and WV 3 southeast of Daniels in the east.

The loop provides access to Little Beaver State Park and the Raleigh County Memorial Airport from US 19 and WV 3.

Major intersections

References

307
Transportation in Raleigh County, West Virginia